Cordioniscus is a genus of woodlice in the family Trichoniscidae. There are about 18 described species in Cordioniscus.

Species
These 18 species belong to the genus Cordioniscus:

 Cordioniscus africanus Vandel, 1955
 Cordioniscus andreevi Schmalfuss & Erhard, 1998
 Cordioniscus antiparosi Andreev, 1985
 Cordioniscus beroni Vandel, 1968
 Cordioniscus bulgaricus Andreev, 1986
 Cordioniscus graecus Vandel, 1958
 Cordioniscus graevei Schmalfuss & Erhard, 1998
 Cordioniscus kalimnosi Andreev, 1997
 Cordioniscus kithnosi Andreev, 1986
 Cordioniscus leleupi Vandel, 1968
 Cordioniscus lusitanicus Reboleira & Taiti, 2015
 Cordioniscus paragamiani Schmalfuss & Erhard, 1998
 Cordioniscus patrizii Brian, 1955
 Cordioniscus riqueri
 Cordioniscus schmalfussi Andreev, 2002
 Cordioniscus spinosus (Patience, 1907)
 Cordioniscus stebbingi (Patience, 1907)
 Cordioniscus vandeli Dalens, 1970

References

Isopoda
Articles created by Qbugbot